A piloti is a column or pillar that lifts a building above ground or water.

Piloti may also refer to:

Piloti (band), a Yugoslav pop-rock band
Piloti (TV series), an Italian television series
Emanuele Piloti, 15th-century Cretan merchant and writer
Piloti, pseudonym of the architecture critic Gavin Stamp